The men's tournament in beach volleyball at the 2015 European Games in Baku, Azerbaijan was the first edition of the event in a European Games. It was held at the Beach Arena from 17 to 21 June 2015.

Preliminary round

Pool A

|}

|}

Pool B

|}

|}

Pool C

|}

|}

Pool D

|}

|}

Pool E

|}

|}

Pool F

|}

|}

Pool G

|}

|}

Pool H

|}

|}

Knockout stage

Round of 24

|}

Round of 16

|}

Quarterfinals

|}

Semifinals

|}

Bronze medal game

|}

Final

|}

External links

European Games
M